Gaahlskagg is a Norwegian black metal band from Sunnfjord, Norway, founded in 1998 by Gaahl (former frontman of Gorgoroth and God Seed) and Skagg. Gaahl and Skagg were also members of the band Sigfader at the time.

History
They first released the Split CD: Erotic Funeral Party I together with Stormfront in 1999. Then in 2000 they released their first full-length: Erotic Funeral, which was recorded in Grieghallen studios during 1999.

Currently Gaahlskagg are working on their second full-length album: Av Norrønt Blod. For this release Hoest (of Taake) will do some guest vocals.

The planned re-release of their debut Erotic Funeral as a set of three 7" LP's (containing the album split into Erotic Funeral party I - III) has been denied by their label. No Colours Records instead re-released the album as 12" LP limited in blue (100 pcs.) and black vinyl.

Members

Founders
 Gaahl - Vocals (1998–present)
 Skagg - Guitars (1998–present)

Current session members
Thurzur - Drums

Former session members
Tormentor - Bass
Mutt - Drums
Herbrand - Samples

Discography
2000 - Erotic Funeral  (has been reprinted a second time with similar artwork and content)

References

External links
Official Gaahlskagg MySpace profile

Musical groups established in 1998
1998 establishments in Norway
Norwegian black metal musical groups
Musical groups from Sogn og Fjordane